Miguel Villarejo de Castro (born 24 August 1988) is a Spanish footballer who plays for Linares Deportivo as a left back.

External links

1988 births
Living people
Sportspeople from the Province of Jaén (Spain)
Spanish footballers
Association football defenders
Segunda División B players
Tercera División players
Córdoba CF B players
RSD Alcalá players
Rayo Vallecano B players
Cultural Leonesa footballers
Coruxo FC players
CF Talavera de la Reina players
Racing de Ferrol footballers
Linares Deportivo footballers
Super League Greece players
Football League (Greece) players
Panthrakikos F.C. players
Kallithea F.C. players
Panachaiki F.C. players
Iraklis Psachna F.C. players
Spanish expatriate footballers
Spanish expatriate sportspeople in Greece
Expatriate footballers in Greece